The 2012 Campbell Fighting Camels football team represented Campbell University in the 2012 NCAA Division I FCS football season. They were led by fifth-year head coach Dale Steele and played their home games at Barker–Lane Stadium. They are a member of the Pioneer Football League.  On November 5, Campbell announced that Steele had been fired. He remained as the team's head coach for their final two games.  They finished the season 1–10, 0–8 in PFL play, to finish in last place.

Schedule

Source: Schedule

References

Campbell
Campbell Fighting Camels football seasons
Campbell Fighting Camels football